Delta Schools is a private school located in Riyadh, Saudi Arabia. Established in 1999, the school operates on a  campus that serves from primary school to secondary school for males and females. The school is accredited by Cognia (formerly known as AdvancED), the largest institution that supervises international curriculum. In addition, the school has also gained excellency award from the Ministry of Education (Saudi Arabia) and is classified A grade "About - Delta Schools Riyadh" for meeting their criteria in teaching and learning. Delta Schools has successfully integrated digital learning in all subject to sustain a global standard that adheres to the development of modern education.

References

External links

 

Private schools in Saudi Arabia
International schools in Saudi Arabia
Schools in Riyadh
Educational institutions established in 1999
1999 establishments in Saudi Arabia